"Wit Me" is a song by American hip hop recording artist T.I., released on May 21, 2013, as a single to promote his 2013 America's Most Wanted concert tour, with fellow American rapper Lil Wayne. The song, which features Lil Wayne, was produced by Grand Hustle in-house producer Cordale "Lil' C" Quinn. The song has since peaked at number 80 on the US Billboard Hot 100 chart.

Music video 

The music video, directed by Philly Fly Boy, was released on May 21, 2013. As of March 2021 it has over 40 million views.

Track listing
 Digital single

Charts

Release history

References

External links
 

2013 singles
2013 songs
T.I. songs
Lil Wayne songs
Grand Hustle Records singles
Songs written by T.I.
Songs written by Lil Wayne
Songs written by Lil' C (record producer)